The Boy, the Mole, the Fox and the Horse is a 2019 illustrated book by Charlie Mackesy. It follows the developing friendship between the four protagonists of the title.

Reception
The Boy, the Mole, the Fox and the Horse has been reviewed by The Hindu, while James Lovegrove, writing in the Financial Times, included it in his 2019 best picture book list.

It was shortlisted for the 2020 British Book Awards Non-Fiction Lifestyle Book of the Year, is the 2019 Barnes & Noble Book of the Year, and won the 2019 Waterstones Book of the Year. 

It is a bestseller.

Animated adaptation

In October 2022, it was announced that the book was being adapted as an animated short film, directed by Peter Baynton and Mackesy, story adapted by Jon Croker and Mackesy, co-produced by Cara Speller, J.J. Abrams and Hannah Minghella, and co-executive produced by Woody Harrelson, with Jude Coward Nicoll voicing the boy, Tom Hollander as the mole, Idris Elba as the fox, and Gabriel Byrne as the horse. Isobel Waller-Bridge composed the short's soundtrack. The short aired on BBC One and streamed on iPlayer on 24 December 2022, and premiered on Apple TV+ as an Apple Original Film on 25 December 2022 outside the United Kingdom.

References

External links
Library holdings of The Boy, the Mole, the Fox and the Horse

2019 children's books
British children's books
British picture books
Books about foxes
Horses in literature
Fictional moles
Children's books about friendship
Ebury Publishing books